Ümit Bozkurt (born 20 April 1976 in Nizip-Gaziantep, Turkey) is a Turkish retired footballer. He played sweeper and defensive midfield position.

He has previously played for Denizlispor (1997–2000), Beşiktaş J.K. (2000–02), Gençlerbirliği (2002–05), Konyaspor (2005–06).

References

External links
Profile at TFF.org

1976 births
Living people
Turkish footballers
Turkey B international footballers
Denizlispor footballers
Beşiktaş J.K. footballers
Gençlerbirliği S.K. footballers
Konyaspor footballers
Manisaspor footballers
Süper Lig players

Association football defenders